Chandu Chekavar (Chathiyan Chanthu, also known as Chandu Panicker), was a sixteenth-century warrior of the Chekavar family from the Hindu Thiyyar caste, mentioned in the folk songs of Northern Kerala called Vadakkan Pattukal. He belongs to the Thiyyar community of the Kadathanad region of Kerala.

Popular culture
 In Oru Vadakkan Veeragatha, a Malayalam film released in 1989, Chandu is portrayed by Mammootty, which won him the National Award for Best Actor. 
 Devan played Chathiyan Chandhu Chekkavar in 2002 Malayalam flim Puthooramputhri Unniyarcha
 Kunal Kapoor portrayed Chandu in the 2016 Malayalam film, Veeram.

See also
 Kalarippayattu

References

Indian warriors
Malayali people
16th-century Indian people
Kalarippayattu practitioners
Indian male martial artists
Martial artists from Kerala
Military personnel from Kerala
Thiyyar warriors